The climate of California varies widely from hot desert to alpine tundra, depending on latitude, elevation, and proximity to the Pacific Coast. California's coastal regions, the Sierra Nevada foothills, and much of the Central Valley have a Mediterranean climate, with warmer, drier weather in summer and cooler, wetter weather in winter. The influence of the ocean generally moderates temperature extremes, creating warmer winters and substantially cooler summers in coastal areas.

Temperature range

The cool California Current offshore, enhanced by upwelling of cold sub-surface waters, often creates summer fog near the coast, creating a warm-summer Mediterranean climate (Köppen climate classification Csb). Further inland, the climate becomes more continental, with some areas turning semi-arid (Köppen BSk), with colder winters and markedly hotter summers. Low-lying inland valleys, especially the Central Valley, have a hot-summer Mediterranean climate (Köppen Csa), with subtropical temperatures but a well-defined summer dry season and a foggy, rainy season in winter.

The temperature gradient between immediate coast and low-lying inland valleys in the south is about 7 °F (4 °C) in winter, the coast being warmer,  and in summer roughly 25 °F (14 °C), the interior being warmer. In Southern California, the temperature differences are approximately 4 °F in winter and 23 °F (2 °C and 13 °C) in summer.

During the cooler winter months (October–March), the Coachella Valley regularly has the warmest winter temperatures out of any place west of the Rocky Mountains. East Los Angeles, the Gateway Cities, and parts of the San Gabriel Valley average the warmest winter high temps in all of the western U.S., and Santa Monica averages the warmest winter lows in all of the western U.S. Palm Springs, a city in the Coachella Valley, averages high/low/mean temperatures of 75 °F/50 °F/63 °F, (24 °C/10 °C/17 °C) respectively during the period of cooler weather from November to April.

The extreme southwest, around San Diego, has a subtropical semi-arid or steppe climate (Koppen BSh) as winters are drier there.

The southeastern regions have a hot arid climate (Koppen BWh), similar to that of the Sahara Desert. In the northern portion of the Mojave Desert on the east side of the state is Death Valley, which has recorded temperatures among the highest in the world. It is common in the summer for temperatures in the valley to surpass . The highest reliably recorded temperature in the world, was recorded in Death Valley on July 10, 1913.

Statewide records
This is also the highest temperature ever recorded on Earth.

Full statistics for selected cities

Precipitation

The prevailing westerly winds from the oceans also bring moisture, and the northern parts of the state generally receive higher annual rainfall amounts than the south. California's mountain ranges influence the climate as well: moisture-laden air from the west cools as it ascends the mountains, dropping moisture; some of the rainiest parts of the state are west-facing mountain slopes.

The Central Valley has a wide range of precipitation. The northern parts of the Central Valley receive substantially greater precipitation from winter storms which sweep down from the Pacific Northwest, while the southernmost regions of the Central Valley are near desert-like because of a lack of precipitation. Parts of the Valley are occasionally filled with thick fog (known locally as "tule fog").

The high mountains, including the Sierra Nevada, the Cascade Range, and the Klamath Mountains, have a mountain climate with snow in winter and mild to moderate heat in summer.

On the east side of the mountains is a drier rain shadow. California's desert climate regions lie east of the high Sierra Nevada and southern California's Transverse Ranges and Peninsular Ranges. The low deserts east of the southern California mountains, including the Imperial and Coachella valleys and the lower Colorado River, are part of the Sonoran Desert, with minimal frost in the winter; the higher elevation deserts of eastern California, including the Mojave Desert, Owens Valley, and the Modoc Plateau, are part of the Great Basin region, which has a more continental climate. During the summer months, especially from July through early September, the region is affected by the Mexican Monsoon (also called the "southwest monsoon"), which drives moisture from the tropical Pacific, Gulf of California, and/or Gulf of Mexico into the deserts, setting off brief, but often torrential thunderstorms, particularly over mountainous terrain.

Despite its long coastline, California is not vulnerable to tropical cyclones. Because of the cold California Current from the North Pacific Ocean and the fact that the storms tend to "steer" west, California has only been hit with two tropical storms in recorded history, a storm which came ashore in 1939 and dumped heavy rainfall on the Los Angeles area and interior deserts. The remnants of tropical systems will affect California more commonly, every several years.

The ENSO cycle has a huge effect on rainfall and snowfall patterns in California, especially during the winter and spring seasons. During the El Niño phase, the jet stream is located south through California, allowing for warmer temperatures and more heavy rains to occur, particularly in the southern portions of the state. During the La Niña phase, the jet stream is much further north, and therefore the far northern portions of California are wetter, while the southern half stays cool and dry.

Incidences of dense fog in Los Angeles have been decreasing over time; researchers surmise the change may be a consequence of both the urban heat Island effect and decreased air pollution.

Wildfires

This makes them prone to wildfires. These can be life-threatening and cause evacuation. Wildfires are less common along the coast because of the cooler, more humid summers, but can occur in autumn when the marine layer is less common, making temperatures warmer and humidity drop significantly.

Glossary
The following are terms used to describe local or regional weather events.

 "Earthquake weather": Any nonseasonal, uncomfortable weather, typically hot and more humid than usual, and often associated with high and mid-level clouds, is spoken of as "earthquake weather", although there is no scientific basis for that relationship.
 Marine layer: The cool, moist layer of air coming in from the ocean which typically includes fog. A standard weather phenomenon along the northern and central California coast from late spring to early fall.
 May Gray/June Gloom: A characteristic weather pattern of late spring (May and June) in which a combination of inland heat, off-shore cool water, and prevailing wind patterns bring foggy and overcast weather to coastal regions. From Point Conception northwards the gloom continues until early autumn. (See also: Catalina eddy)
 Pineapple Express: A complex combination of events, bringing high levels of torrential precipitation to California. The Pineapple Express occurs when the jet stream dips across California, and warm, humid air from the mid-Pacific (from the vicinity of Hawaii–hence, the name) is drawn towards California. The resulting combination can cause extraordinarily heavy rains. A January 2005 Pineapple Express dropped nearly 25 inches (63.5 cm) of rain in Santa Barbara County.
 Santa Ana winds: Santa Anas are hot, high winds that blow from the eastern mountains and deserts towards coastal southern California, usually in the spring and fall. They are the result of air pressure buildup between the Sierra Nevada and the Rocky Mountains. This air mass spills out, is pulled by gravity, and circulates clockwise around the high pressure area, bringing winds from the east and northeast; as the air descends in elevation, it heats up and the humidity plummets to less than 15 percent. It is often said that the air is heated and dried as it passes through the nearby deserts, but according to meteorologists this is a popular misconception (it is actually due to adiabatic compression as the air flows from the higher elevations down to sea level); during Santa Ana conditions, it is typically hotter along the coast than in the deserts. As the Santa Ana winds are channeled through the mountain passes they can approach hurricane force. The combination of speed, heat, and dryness turns the chaparral into explosive fuel for wildfires.
 Tule fog: A thick ground fog that settles in the San Joaquin Valley and Sacramento Valley areas of the California Central Valley. Tule fog forms during the mid fall, winter to early spring after the first significant rainfall. This phenomenon is named after the tule grass wetlands of the Central Valley. Tule fog can extend from Bakersfield to Chico. Accidents caused by the tule fog are the leading cause of weather-related deaths in California; visibility is usually less than an eighth of a mile (about 600 feet or 183–200 m), but can be less than 10 feet (3 m).

See also
 Climate change in California
 Climate of southern California
 Floods in California
 List of wettest known tropical cyclones in California

References

External links
 More about the climate of California
 Climate of Northwest California

 
Articles containing video clips
California